Aka, AKA or a.k.a. may refer to:

 "Also known as", used to introduce an alternative name

Languages
 Aka language (Sudan)
 Aka language, in the Central African Republic
 Hruso language, in India, also referred to as Aka
 a prefix in the names of Great Andamanese languages
 Akan language (ISO 639-2 and ISO 639-3 codes)

People
 Aka (name), a list of people with the given name or surname
 Aka people, in the Central African Republic and Congo
 Aka (tribe), of Kameng, Arunachal Pradesh, India
 AKA (rapper), stage name of South African Kiernan Forbes (1988–2023)

Places

Japan
 Aka, Fukuoka, a village
 Mount Aka (Daisetsuzan), Daisetsuzan National Park, Hokkaidō
 Mount Aka (Yatsugatake), Yatsugatake Mountains, Honshū
 Aka Island, Okinawa Prefecture
 Aka River, Yamagata Prefecture

Elsewhere
 Aka, Hungary, a village
 Aka Hills, Arunachal Pradesh, India
 Aka, Iran, a village in Khuzestan Province

Arts and entertainment

Film and television
 AKA (film), a 2002 film
 "A.K.A." (Jericho episode), a 2007 episode of the TV series Jericho
 a.k.a. Cartoon, a Canadian animation company
 Aka Pella (Histeria!), a character from the cartoon Histeria!
 Channel AKA, former name of the UK music television channel Now 70s

Music
 The A.K.A.s, an American rock band
 A.K.A. (album), a 2014 album by Jennifer Lopez
 "AKA", a video by True Widow

Sports
 Aka (Burmese), martial arts movements
 Aka (sailing), part of a multi-hull boat
 Aka Arena, a football stadium in Hønefoss, Norway
 American Kickboxing Academy
 American Kitefliers Association
 Australian Karting Association

Science and technology
 Alcoholic ketoacidosis, a medical condition
 Amphibious cargo ship (former US Navy hull classification symbol)
 Authentication and Key Agreement (protocol), a security protocol used in 3G networks

Transportation
 Ankang Fuqiang Airport (IATA code: AKA), China
 Atka Airport (FAA location identifier: AKA), Alaska
 Aka Station, a railway station in Aka, Fukuoka Prefecture, Japan
 AKA (car), a defunct automobile manufacture from Czechoslovak

Other uses
 Manpower Directorate of the Israeli Defence Forces
 Alpha Kappa Alpha, an African-American sorority
 Aga Khan Academies, a network non-denominational day and residential schools

See also

 Akas (disambiguation)
 Akka (disambiguation)
 Akha (disambiguation)
 

Language and nationality disambiguation pages